This is a list of notable Chilean actors of film, television, theatre, radio, and others.

A 

 Ignacio Achurra
 Patricio Achurra
 Tamara Acosta
 Luis Alarcón
 Daniel Alcaíno
 Sigrid Alegría
 Ignacia Allamand
 Marcelo Alonso
 Nathalia Aragonese
 Loreto Aravena
 Iván Arenas
 Raquel Argandoña
 Claudio Arredondo
 Carolina Arregui
 Maricarmen Arrigorriaga
 Cristián Arriagada

B 

 Pedro de la Barra
 Alicia Barrié
 Eduardo Barril
 Carmen Barros
 Paz Bascuñán
 Schlomit Baytelman
 Gloria Benavides
 Bastián Bodenhöfer
 Miranda Bodenhöfer
 José Bohr
 Graciela Bon
 Felipe Braun
 Nelson Brodt
 Edgardo Bruna
 Carmen Bunster
 Claudia Burr

C 

 Santiago Cabrera
 César Caillet
 Adela Calderón
 Felipe Camiroaga
 Elsa del Campillo
 Cristián Campos
 Néstor Cantillana
 Alfredo Castro
 Bélgica Castro
 Óscar Castro Ramírez
 Claudia Celedón
 Oona Chaplin
 Claudia Conserva
 Javiera Contador
 Ángela Contreras
 Patricio Contreras
 Tiago Correa
 Elvira Cristi
 Íngrid Cruz
 Luciano Cruz-Coke
 Beto Cuevas
 Natalia Cuevas

D 

 Tito Davison
 Mariana Derderian
 Claudia di Girolamo
 Mariana di Girolamo
 Carlos Díaz
 Javiera Díaz de Valdés
 Alejandra Dueñas

E 
 Luciana Echeverría
 Daniel Emilfork
 Álvaro Escobar
 Álvaro Espinoza

F 
 Carolina Fadic
 Juan Falcón
 Fernando Farías
 Roberto Farías
 Nona Fernández
 Francisco Flores del Campo
 Alejandro Flores
 Amaya Forch
 Alejandra Fosalba
 Rafael Frontaura de la Fuente
 Cristián de la Fuente

G 
 

 Liliana García
 Jorge Garcia
 Paulina García
 Cristián García-Huidobro
 Malú Gatica
 Francisca Gavilán
 Ana María Gazmuri
 Rebeca Ghigliotto
 Luis Gnecco
 Mónica Godoy
 Alejandro Goic
 Álvaro Gómez
 Ana González
 Coca Guazzini
 Catalina Guerra
 Juan José Gurruchaga
 Delfina Guzmán

H 

 Gabriela Hernández
 Sergio Hernández
 Alejandra Herrera
 Constanza Herrero
 Consuelo Holzapfel
 Ximena Huilipán

I 

 Francisca Imboden
 Paz Irarrázabal
 Ingrid Isensee
 María Izquierdo
 Lorenza Izzo

J 
 Víctor Jara
 Luz Jiménez
 Adan Jodorowsky
 Brontis Jodorowsky
 Alejandro Jodorowsky
 Julio Jung

K 

 Katty Kowaleczko
 Stefan Kramer
 Pablo Krögh
 Aline Kuppenheim

L 
 Solange Lackington
 Fernando Larraín
 Paola Lattus
 Mirella Latorre
 Coco Legrand
 Ariel Levy
 Blanca Lewin
 Elvira López
 Patricia López
 Mariana Loyola

M 

 María Maluenda
 Sebastián Mancilla
 Manuela Martelli
 Yoya Martínez
 Ariel Mateluna
 Francisco Melo
 Francisca Merino
 Nelly Meruane
 Carolina Mestrovic
 Adelqui Migliar
 Julio Milostich
 Daniella Monet
 Andrea Molina
 Cristina Montt
 Álvaro Morales
 Héctor Morales
 Gloria Münchmeyer
 Renato Munster
 Daniel Muñoz
 Diego Muñoz
 Lautaro Murúa

N 

 Amparo Noguera
 Héctor Noguera
 Matías Novoa

O 
 Sandra O'Ryan
 María Gracia Omegna
 Óscar Olavarría
 Gonzalo Olave
 Maite Orsini
 Marcela Osorio

P 

 Cote de Pablo
 Andrés Palacios
 Catalina Palacios
 Myriam Palacios
 Roberto Parada
 Lux Pascal
 Pedro Pascal
 Jorge Pedreros
 Francisco Pérez-Bannen
 Mauricio Pesutic
 Malucha Pinto
 Roberto Poblete
 Valentina Pollarolo
 Antonio Prieto
 Lorene Prieto
 María José Prieto
 Catalina Pulido

Q 
 Boris Quercia

R 

 Daniela Ramírez
 Eduardo Ravani
 Ana Reeves
 Eugenio Retes
 Francisco Reyes
 Teresita Reyes
 Carmina Riego
 Andrés Rillón
 Gladys del Río
 Antonella Ríos
 Patricia Rivadeneira
 Ximena Rivas
 Gonzalo Robles
 Alicia Rodríguez
 Marcelo Romo
 Shenda Román
 Denise Rosenthal
 Liliana Ross
 Álvaro Rudolphy
 Bárbara Ruiz-Tagle

S 

 Catalina Saavedra
 Katherine Salosny
 Marisela Santibáñez
 Antonia Santa María
 Silvia Santelices
 Valeria Sarmiento
 Augusto Schuster
 Pablo Schwarz
 José Secall
 Willy Semler
 Rosita Serrano
 Nissim Sharim
 Pedro Sienna
 Alejandro Sieveking
 Esperanza Silva
 Osvaldo Silva
 Belén Soto
 José Soza
 Karla Souza
 María Elena Swett

T 
 Sussan Taunton
 Alejandro Trejo

U 

 Fernanda Urrejola
 Paulina Urrutia
 María José Urzúa

V 

 Adriana Vacarezza
 Jaime Vadell
 Luz Valdivieso
 Gonzalo Valenzuela
 Loreto Valenzuela
 Roberto Vander
 Leonor Varela
 Valentina Vargas
 Guido Vecchiola
 Andrea Velasco
 Mireya Véliz
 Benjamín Vicuña
 Violeta Vidaurre
 Tomás Vidiella
 Helvecia Viera
 Nelson Villagra
 Araceli Vitta
 Sonia Viveros
 Paola Volpato

Z 
 Jorge Zabaleta
 Marko Zaror
 Antonia Zegers
 Elisa Zulueta

References

See also 
List of Chilean films
List of Chilean telenovelas

Chile
Actors